Vladimir Sergeyevich Volodin (1896 – 1958) was a Soviet and Russian stage and film actor. People's Artist of the RSFSR (1947).

He died on March 27, 1958 in Moscow, and was buried at the Novodevichy Cemetery.

Selected filmography
 1936 – Circus as Ludvig Osipovich, Soviet circus director
 1938 – Volga-Volga as old pilot 
 1940 – Tanya as professor Pyotr Ustinovich Taldykin
 1946 – The First Glove as Ivan Vasilyevich Privalov
 1949 – Cossacks of the Kuban as Anton Petrovich Mudretsov
 1954 – World Champion as Privalov
 1956 – A Crazy Day as Filipp Maksimovich, door-keeper

References

External links
 
 Vladimir Volodin
 

1896 births
1958 deaths
20th-century Russian male actors
Male actors from Moscow
Honored Artists of the RSFSR
People's Artists of the RSFSR
Stalin Prize winners
Recipients of the Order of the Red Banner of Labour
Soviet male film actors
Soviet male singers
Soviet male stage actors
Soviet male voice actors
Burials at Novodevichy Cemetery